Pa Omar Babou (born 1 October 1998) is a Gambian footballer who currently plays as a forward for Bangladesh Premier League club Fortis FC.

Career statistics

Club

Notes

References

1998 births
Living people
Gambian footballers
The Gambia under-20 international footballers
Association football forwards
Hapoel Nir Ramat HaSharon F.C. players
HNK Hajduk Split players
FC Dila Gori players
Lommel S.K. players
First Football League (Croatia) players
Erovnuli Liga players
Liga Leumit players
Expatriate footballers in Croatia
Expatriate footballers in Georgia (country)
Expatriate footballers in Israel
Expatriate footballers in Belgium
Gambian expatriate sportspeople in Israel
Gambian expatriate sportspeople in Belgium